Victoria University of Wellington Association Football Club (VUWAFC) is an amateur football club based in Wellington, New Zealand. The clubrooms are located beneath the Wellington Cable Car at Kelburn Park, across the road from the Victoria University Kelburn Campus, however, many of the club's home games are played on turf at Boyd Wilson Field. The club is affiliated to the Capital Football which is in turn affiliated with New Zealand Football. The Women's First Team competes in the W-League competition and the Men's First Team competes in the Capital Premier competition. The club has a strong association with Victoria University of Wellington but membership within the club is not restricted to past or present students of the university.

History
Victoria University of Wellington Association Football Club was founded in 1943 and is the third-oldest University football club in New Zealand. It now has 20 teams (4 women's and 16 men's) and over 300 registered members. Past players include New Zealand international Alan Preston and Brian Sutton-Smith who was awarded the first Education PhD in New Zealand. The clubs top period was in the 1950s when it played in the Capital Football top grade as well as making the semi-final of the Chatham Cup. Since then the club has mainly played in the Capital Premier and Capital 1 grades. They have made the fourth round of the Chatham Cup a number of times including in 1979 Chatham Cup, 1988 Chatham Cup, 1994 Chatham Cup and 2014 Chatham Cup.

Club Honours
VUWAFC Men's and Women's First team honours include: 
 Central League Division Two: Winners 1998, Third 1992
 Capital Premier* (Venus Shield): Runners Up 1956, 1973, Third 1979
 Capital One (Power Cup): Winners 1950, 1952, 1965, 2001, 2018 Runners Up 1988, 1992, 2012, Third 1999, 2006
 Capital Two: Winners 1998, Runners Up 2010, 2011, 2012
 Hilton Petone Cup Winners: 1990, 1992
 Women's Premier Division: Winners 2020 Runners Up 1995, 1996, 2012, 2018 Third 2005, 2013
 Women's Second Division: Winners 1981 Women's
 Premier Cup: Winners 2010, 2011

League standings
League standings for all women's teams as of 28 August 2018

Note - Women's Tier two competitions (Division 1 - Division 3) were split into two rounds as indicated by (1) and (2).

League standings for all men's teams as of 28 August 2018

Note - Men's Tier two competitions (Capital 5 - Capital 12) were split into two rounds as indicated by (1) and (2).

References 

Association football clubs in Wellington
Association Football